Susana Maria Villaverde (born 9 February 1955) was a former Swiss tennis player born in Argentina.

She played in singles at the French Open in 1976. Lost to the Italian Daniela Marzano in the first round. Her partner in women's doubles, Argentina Elvira Weisenberger lost in the Second round to Uruguayan Fiorella Bonicelli and French Gail Chanfreau.

Career finals

Singles (2–0)

Doubles (2–5)

References

External links
 
 

1955 births
Swiss people of Argentine descent
Sportspeople of Argentine descent
Argentine female tennis players
Swiss female tennis players
Living people